The 2009–10 season was PFC CSKA Sofia's 62nd consecutive season in A Group. This article shows player statistics and all matches (official and friendly) that the club have and will play during the 2009–10 season.

Team Kit 

The team kit for the 2009–10 season is produced by Uhlsport and sponsored by Globul since 7 September 2009. The club introduced a new third kit at the game against Derry City

Players

Squad information 

Appearances for competitive matches only

|-
|colspan="14"|Players sold or loaned out after the start of the season:

|}

As of game played start of season

Players in/out

Summer transfers 

In:

Out:

Winter transfers 

In:

Out:

Player seasonal records 

Competitive matches only. Updated to games played 31 May 2010.

Key

Goalscorers

Pre-season and friendlies

Competitions

A Group

Table

Results summary

Results by round

Fixtures and results

Bulgarian Cup

Europa League

Third qualifying round

Play-off round

Group Stage

See also 

PFC CSKA Sofia

References

External links 
 CSKA Official Site
 Bulgarian A Professional Football Group
 UEFA Profile

PFC CSKA Sofia seasons
Cska Sofia